Fortenberry Glacier is a glacier on the north side of Tapsell Foreland in Victoria Land, Antarctica. It was first mapped by the United States Geological Survey from surveys and U.S. Navy air photos, 1960–63, and was named by the Advisory Committee on Antarctic Names for Lieutenant Ralph M. Fortenberry, U.S. Navy, Medical Officer at McMurdo Station, Hut Point Peninsula, Ross Island, 1960. The glacier lies situated on the Pennell Coast, a portion of Antarctica lying between Cape Williams and Cape Adare.

References 

Glaciers of Pennell Coast